James Bowie High School is a public high school in southwest Austin, Texas, named after Texan revolutionary James Bowie. With a student body of 2,875, Bowie is the largest school in the Austin Independent School District and the fourth largest secondary school in Central Texas. James Bowie High School's principal is Mark Robinson.

Academics
Bowie was named a National Blue Ribbon School in 1992-93. Other awards include 2002 "Exemplary" School of Excellence by Texas Education Agency, 2002 "Gold Performance Acknowledgments" by Texas Education Agency, 2002 5 Star High School by Texas Monthly & National Center for Educational Accountability, and 2004 Recognized High School by Texas Education Agency. Children at Risk ranked Bowie the #8 public high school in Austin in 2012.

Notable people
Twins Marcus and Michael Griffin played football for Bowie before playing for the University of Texas Longhorns and in the NFL. Both players were part of the 2005 National Championship roster.
Bowie's basketball team is coached by Celester Collier, who appeared in the 2006 film The Quiet.
Stephen Randolph, former Major League Baseball player and pitcher for the Yokohama BayStars of NPB.

References

External links
Bowie's home page
School Report Cards

High schools in Austin, Texas
Austin Independent School District high schools
Educational institutions established in 1988
1988 establishments in Texas